The Cecil John Rhodes Statue is a monument erected at Company's Garden in Cape Town. The statue was erected in 1908. It features a full body replica of Cecil Rhodes wearing a three-piece suit, standing with his left hand raised and pointing north.  It has been compared to the Jan van Riebeeck statue, which faces south and asserts a different sense of occupation.  Despite its size, the present location of the monument in the Company's Garden makes it less significant in comparison to that of Jan Smuts at Adderley Street, Cape Town, a location that had been considered for the placement of the Rhodes statue.

Location 
The monument is located in the Company's Garden on a secondary axis of the Iziko South African Museum. The original plan was to use the statue as a visual landmark at the top of Adderley Street; however, Sir Herbert Baker objected to the placement of the statue at the top of Adderley Street because of the scale of the statue. His concern was that the statue could have a dwarfing effect on the cathedral or other monuments in the vicinity. Due to a lack of consensus as to where the statue should be placed by Baker and Francis Masey, the statue was placed in the Company's Garden instead of on Adderley Street.

Architecture 
The architectural design is described as an expression of imperialist interest in Southern Africa. It was made of non-orthogonal and roughly hewn sandstone material to symbolise Rhodes' love for the natural environment and his interest in mining, which was the main focus of his industrial interest in South Africa. Some historians and architects argue that the monument is an expression of Rhodes' interest in what was then called Transvaal and the Orange Free State.

Life 

Rhodes (5 July 1853 – 26 March 1902) was a British businessman, mining magnate, and politician in South Africa.  An ardent believer in British colonialism, Rhodes was the founder of the southern African territory of Rhodesia, which was named after him in 1895. South Africa's Rhodes University is also named after Rhodes. He set up the provisions of the Rhodes Scholarship, which is funded by his estate.

See also 
Rhodes Memorial

Notes and references 

1908 sculptures
Buildings and structures in Cape Town
Monuments and memorials in South Africa
Sculptures in South Africa
Cultural depictions of Cecil Rhodes